Jens Holm (born 18 April 1971) is a Swedish politician. 2006-2009 he served as a Member of the European Parliament (MEP) for the Left Party
sitting with the EUL/NGL group. On 27 September 2006 he took up the seat vacated by Jonas Sjöstedt. He was elected to the Swedish Parliament in the 2010 election.

He is also a founding member of Colombianätverket ("The Colombia Network"), a Sweden-based organisation which describes its objective as to "support efforts toward a peaceful and socially just solution to the conflict in Colombia". In 2013, the officer Hans-Erik Sjöholm claimed that he as part of his infiltration of the Left Party on behalf of the Swedish Intelligence Service had spied on Holm, due to Holm's connection to FARC.

Holm argues that meat production is environmentally hazardous, and in March 2007 he made a proposal to introduce taxes for meat producers. He is also an ethical vegetarian himself, and was a vegan between 1994 and 2008.

References

External links
Jensholm.se, official website and blog

1971 births
Living people
People from Sundsvall
Members of the Riksdag from the Left Party (Sweden)
Swedish bloggers
MEPs for Sweden 2004–2009
Left Party (Sweden) MEPs
Members of the Riksdag 2010–2014
Members of the Riksdag 2014–2018